The Z2 was an electromechanical (mechanical and relay-based) digital computer that was completed by Konrad Zuse in 1940. It was an improvement on the Z1 Zuse built in his parents' home, which used the same mechanical memory. In the Z2, he replaced the arithmetic and control logic with 600 electrical relay circuits, weighing over 600 pounds. 

The Z2 could read 64 words from punch cards. Photographs and plans for the Z2 were destroyed by the Allied bombing during World War II. In contrast to the Z1, the Z2 used 16-bit fixed-point arithmetic instead of 22-bit floating point.

Zuse presented the Z2 in 1940 to members of the DVL (today DLR) and member , whose support helped fund the successor model Z3.

Specifications

See also
 Z1
 Z3
 Z4

References

External links
 Z2 via Horst Zuse (son) web page
 The Zuse Computers (by Raúl Rojas) in RESURRECTION The Bulletin of the Computer Conservation Society  Number 37 Spring 2006

Electro-mechanical computers
Z02
Mechanical computers
Computer-related introductions in 1940
Konrad Zuse
German inventions of the Nazi period
1940s computers
Computers designed in Germany